Africa Texas Style is a 1967 British adventure film directed by Andrew Marton and starring John Mills, Hugh O'Brian and Nigel Green. The plot is about two American cowboys who are hired by a British rancher to oversee his estate in Kenya. Shot on location in Africa and Florida, this film led to the TV show Cowboy in Africa starring Chuck Connors. The opening scene of the film includes a cameo appearance by star Mills' equally famous actress-daughter Hayley Mills.

Cast
 Hugh O'Brian - Jim Sinclair
 John Mills - Wing Commander Hayes
 Nigel Green - Karl Bekker
 Tom Nardini - John Henry
 Adrienne Corri - Fay Carter
 Ronald Howard - Hugo Copp
 Charles Malinda - Sampson
 Honey Wamala - Mr. Oyondi
 Charles Hayes - Veterinary
 Stephen Kikumu - Peter
 Ali Twaha - Turk
 Mohammed Abdullah - Witch doctor

References

External links
 

1967 films
British adventure films
1967 adventure films
1960s English-language films
Films directed by Andrew Marton
Films scored by Malcolm Arnold
Paramount Pictures films
1960s British films